Defenders of the Faith: A Guidebook to Clerics and Paladins is an optional rulebook for the 3rd edition of Dungeons & Dragons, and notable for its trade paperback format.

Contents
The guidebook provides supplemental information for characters belonging to the Cleric and Paladin base classes. This book introduced Divine Feats, which are still used in version 3.5. This book also contained tips for creating and playing characters of the aforementioned class, as well as several prestige classes.

Publication history
The book was designed by Rich Redman and James Wyatt, and was published in 2001 by Wizards of the Coast.  Cover art was by Brom, with interior art by Dennis Cramer.

Although it was not updated to 3.5 Edition, most of the book's prestige classes were reintroduced in the 3.5 supplemental sourcebook Complete Divine.

Reception
The reviewer from Pyramid found the advice on effectively playing clerics and paladins useful, even if it "rarely goes beyond the basics information", and found the section on special paladin mounts to be one of the most interesting areas.

See also
Masters of the Wild
Song and Silence
Sword and Fist
Tome and Blood

References

External links
Product page at wizards.com

Dungeons & Dragons sourcebooks
Role-playing game supplements introduced in 2001